Enrique Jiménez may refer to:

Enrique Adolfo Jiménez (1888–1970), provisional President of Panama, 1945–1948
Enrique el Mellizo (1848–1906) born Enrique Jiménez Fernández, flamenco singer
Enrique Jiménez (wrestler), Mexican who competed at the 1972 Summer Olympics